Metronom Theater  is a theatre in Oberhausen, Germany.

Productions
 1999 – Juni 2001: Tabaluga & Lilli
 November 2001 – December 2001: Vom Geist der Weihnacht 
 April 2002 – June 2002, September 2002 – December 2002: Falco meets Amadeus
 November 2003 – December 2003: Vom Geist der Weihnacht
 September 2004 – February 2005: Blue Balance

Stage Entertainment:
 December 2005 – January 2007: Beauty and the Beast
 March 2007 – October 2008: Blue Man Group
 November 2008 – January 2010: Tanz der Vampire
 March 2010 – September 2011: Wicked 
 October 2011 – October 2012: Dirty Dancing
 December 2012 – October 2013: Ich war noch niemals in New York
 December 2013 - February 2015: Sister Act 
 March 2015 - October 2015: Mamma Mia!
 November 2015 - September 2016: Das Phantom der Oper
 November 2016 - September 2018: Tarzan
 November 2018 - September 2019: Bat Out of Hell
 November 2019 – 12 March 2020: Tanz der Vampire

Theatres in North Rhine-Westphalia
Tourist attractions in Oberhausen